Madame Aema 11 ( - Aema Buin 11) is a 1995 South Korean film directed by Joe Moung-hwa. It was the eleventh and final entry in the Madame Aema series, the longest-running film series in Korean cinema.

until 2016 was now been an attributed new generation madame aema 2016. (애마부인 2016)

Plot
In this episode in the Madame Aema series, Aema is married to a respected scholar who is preoccupied with his research and unable to satisfy her sex drive. Aema's husband becomes the target of a Japanese businessman with ties to the yakuza. Seeking to take his research, the Japanese businessman blackmail Aema's husband by taping him in a compromising position with a young woman he has sent to seduce him. Meanwhile, Aema is indulging in an affairs of her own.

Cast
 Lee Da-yeon: Madame Aema
 Lee Joo-cheol
 Joen Hae-yoeng
 Han Eun-jeong
 Cha Ryong
 Yu Ga-hui
 Kook Jong-hwan
 Na Dong-geun
 Choe Myeong-ho
 Jo Seok-hyeon

Bibliography

English

Korean

Notes

Madame Aema
1995 films
1990s erotic films
1990s Korean-language films
South Korean sequel films